Bedroom Eyes is a 1984 erotic thriller film starring Kip Gilman and Barbara Law and directed by William Fruet.

Plot
A young businessman and avid jogger finds a prime voyeurism spot on his nightly route. After some time spying he witnesses a murder instead. He soon becomes involved in a variety of situations stemming from the incident.

References

External links
 

1980s erotic thriller films
1984 films
English-language Canadian films
Films shot in Toronto
1980s mystery films
Films directed by William Fruet
Canadian erotic thriller films
1980s English-language films
1980s Canadian films